Microcharacidium is a genus of South American darters.  There are currently 3 recognized species in this genus.

Species
 Microcharacidium eleotrioides (Géry, 1960)
 Microcharacidium gnomus Buckup, 1993
 Microcharacidium weitzmani Buckup, 1993

References
 

Characiformes genera
Fish of South America
Crenuchidae